The Regius Professorship of Greek is a professorship at Trinity College Dublin. The chair was founded by George III in 1761.

List of Regius Professors of Greek
 Theaker Wilder 1761– 
 John Stokes 1764–1765 
 Henry Joseph Dabzac 1775–1778
 Arthur Browne 1792–5
 John Barrett 1796-1797
 Arthur Browne 1797–9
 Arthur Browne 1801–05

 Richard Graves 1810–
 Franc Sadleir 1833–1838
 William Hepworth Thompson 1853–1866
 John Kells Ingram 1866–1877
 Robert Yelverton Tyrrell 1880–1898
 John Bagnell Bury 1898–1902
 John Isaac Beare 1902–1915
 Josiah Gilbart Smyly 1915–1927
 William Bedell Stanford 1940–1980
 John Myles Dillon 1980–2006
 Brian McGing 2006–2019 
 Ahuvia Kahane 2019-

See also
Regius Professor of Greek (Cambridge)
Regius Professor of Greek (Oxford)

References

1761 establishments in Ireland
Greek, Regius
Greek, Regius, Dublin, Trinity College
Greek, Regius, Dublin, Trinity College
Greek, Dublin